Dylan Edward Connolly (born 2 May 1995) is an Irish professional footballer who plays as a winger for League of Ireland Premier Division club Bohemians.

Career

Early career 
After playing for Bohemians, Shelbourne, Ipswich Town and Bray Wanderers, Connolly signed for Dundalk on a -year deal in June 2017.

AFC Wimbledon
On 3 January 2019, Connolly signed for AFC Wimbledon from Dundalk for an undisclosed fee. He was released at the end of the 2019–20 season following the end of his contract.

Bradford City (loan)
He signed on loan for Bradford City in September 2019. His loan expired on 1 May 2020.

St Mirren 
On 25 August 2020, Connolly joined Scottish Premiership side St Mirren. At the end of the 2020–21, Connolly was offered a new contract with the club.

Northampton Town
Despite being offered a new contract to stay in Scotland, on 15 June 2021 it was announced that Connolly had agreed a deal to join League Two side Northampton Town upon the expiration of his contract with St Mirren, signing a two-year contract at Sixfields Stadium.

Morecambe
On 31 January 2022, Connolly joined League One side Morecambe on a deal until the end of the 2022–23 season. On 8 January 2023, it was announced that his contract had been cancelled by mutual consent after scoring 1 goal in his 43 appearances for the club in all competitions.

Bohemians
On 9 January 2023, it was announced that Connolly had signed for his first senior club Bohemians, returning to the League of Ireland Premier Division.

Career statistics

Honours
Individual
PFAI Team of the Year: 2014 First Division

References

External links

Dylan Connolly at afcwimbledon.co.uk

Association football wingers
1995 births
Living people
Association footballers from County Dublin
Bohemian F.C. players
Shelbourne F.C. players
Ipswich Town F.C. players
Dundalk F.C. players
Bray Wanderers F.C. players
AFC Wimbledon players
Bradford City A.F.C. players
St Mirren F.C. players
Northampton Town F.C. players
Morecambe F.C. players
League of Ireland players
English Football League players
Scottish Professional Football League players
Republic of Ireland youth international footballers
Republic of Ireland association footballers
Republic of Ireland expatriate association footballers
Expatriate footballers in England
Republic of Ireland under-21 international footballers
Expatriate footballers in Scotland